A very high-level programming language (VHLL) is a programming language with a very high level of abstraction, used primarily as a professional programmer productivity tool.

VHLLs are usually domain-specific languages, limited to a very specific application, purpose, or type of task, and they are often scripting languages (especially extension languages), controlling a specific environment. For this reason, very high-level programming languages are often referred to as goal-oriented programming languages.

The term VHLL was used in the 1990s for what are today more often called high-level programming languages (not "very") used for scripting, such as Perl, Python, php, Ruby, and Visual Basic.

See also
Automatic programming
Low-level programming language
Feature-oriented programming

Notes

References

Symposium on Very High Level Languages. SIG- PLAN Notices (ACM) 9, 4 (April 1974), 1-132.
Teichroew, D. A survey of languages for stating requirements for computer-based information systems. Proc. AFIPS 1972 FJCC, AFIPS Press, Montvale, N.J., pp. 1203-1224. 
Libre Software Meeting 2004
Libre Software Meeting: Proceedings of the VHLL track (2004).
Libre Software Meeting (2003) VHLL Track announcement

 Programming language classification